An Evening of Edgar Allan Poe is a 1970 film which features Vincent Price reciting four of Edgar Allan Poe's stories, directed by Kenneth Johnson, with music by Les Baxter.

The stories included are: "The Tell-Tale Heart", "The Sphinx", "The Cask of Amontillado" and "The Pit and the Pendulum".

See also
 List of American films of 1970

References

External links 
 
 

Films based on short fiction
American horror television films
1970s mystery films
1970 television films
Films based on The Pit and the Pendulum
Films based on The Tell-Tale Heart
Films based on works by Edgar Allan Poe
1970 horror films
1970 films
American mystery films
Television shows based on works by Edgar Allan Poe
Films directed by Kenneth Johnson (producer)
1970s English-language films
1970s American films